Kristina Olsson (born 1956) is an Australian writer, journalist and teacher. She is a recipient of the Barbara Jefferis Award, Queensland Literary Award, and Nita Kibble Literary Award.

Early life
Kristina Olsson was raised in Brisbane, Australia of Swedish and Australian heritage.

Career
Olsson studied journalism at the University of Queensland and went on to write for The Australian, The Courier-Mail and Sunday Mail, the Sydney Sunday Telegraph and Griffith Review.

Her first novel In One Skin was published by the University of Queensland Press in 2001. This was followed by the biography Kilroy Was Here, which told the story of prison reformer Debbie Kilroy . In 2010 her novel The China Garden won the Barbara Jefferis Award, which is offered annually for Australian novels which depict women and girls positively, or empower the position of women in society.

Kristina's nonfiction work Boy, Lost: A Family Memoir won the 2013 Queensland Literary Award for Best Nonfiction and the Nita Kibble Literary Award.  It was shortlisted for the Victorian Premier's Literary Award, the New South Wales Premier's Literary Award, the Stella Prize and the Australian Human Rights Commission Literature Award.

Olsson has also worked as a government advisor, and as a teacher of creative writing and journalism. She supervises and mentors post-graduate writing students and also works as a manuscript assessor and editor.

Books

Fiction
 In One Skin (2001) 
 Kilroy Was Here (2005) 
 The China Garden (2009) 
 Shell (2018)

Non-fiction
 Boy, lost: a family memoir (2013)

Awards and nominations

Prizes 
 2010 — Barbara Jefferis Award for The China Garden
 2013 — Queensland Literary Awards: Nonfiction Book Award for Boy, Lost: A Family Memoir
 2014 — Nita Kibble Literary Award for Boy, Lost: A Family Memoir

Shortlisted 
 2010 — Nita Kibble Literary Award for The China Garden
2019 — Queensland Literary Awards: The University of Queensland Non-Fiction Book Award for Shell

Longlisted 

 2020 — International Dublin Literary Award for Shell

References

External links
 

1956 births
Living people
University of Queensland alumni
Writers from Brisbane
Australian people of Swedish descent
Australian women novelists